is a Japanese pop singer and actress made a debut under Avex Trax label. Before her career started, Shela was the lead vocalist and saxophonist of the three-member band FBI from 1997 to 1998. In 1999 she signed with Avex Trax, and embarked on a solo career. In 2004 she joined the band, Sunny-side Up, and split with the original line-up in 2005. As of 2009 Shela has made her comeback currently signed to the indie label Rosso Records.

Single 
 [1999.12.01] White
 [2000.04.26] Red
 [2000.10.18] purple
 [2001.02.15] orange
 [2001.05.03] sepia
 [2001.11.28] pink
 [2002.04.10] Rose
 [2002.09.19] Himawari
 [2003.01.22] Baby's breath
 [2003.04.16] cherry blossom
 [2003.06.25] Clover (クローバー)
 [2004.03.03] Tsuki to Taiyou (月と太陽)
 [2005.05.18] Dear my friends
 [2009.09.01] crystal

Albums 
 [2001.05.09] COLORLESS
 [2003.07.24] Garden
 [2005.07.06] COLORS single collection vol.1
 [2005.07.06] FLORAL single collection vol.2

References

External links 
 

 

1980 births
Japanese women pop singers
Living people
Musicians from Hokkaido
21st-century Japanese singers
21st-century Japanese women singers